Paugussett State Forest is a Connecticut state forest with two separate sections located on impoundments of the Housatonic River in the town of Newtown. It offers boating access to the river and hiking on the blue-blazed Lillinonah Trail.

References

Further reading
Lillinonah Trail Connecticut Museum Quest
Paugussett State Forest Berkshire Hiking

External links
Paugussett State Forest Connecticut Department of Energy and Environmental Protection
Paugussett State Forest Upper Block Map Connecticut Department of Energy and Environmental Protection
Paugussett State Forest Lower Block Map Connecticut Department of Energy and Environmental Protection

Connecticut state forests
Parks in Fairfield County, Connecticut
Newtown, Connecticut
1940s establishments in Connecticut
Protected areas established in the 1940s